Opsariichthys duchuunguyeni is a species of cyprinid in the genus Opsariichthys.

References

Cyprinid fish of Asia
Taxa named by Thien Quang Huynh
Taxa named by Chen I-Shiung
Fish of Vietnam